This article includes a list of 57 member states of the Organisation of Islamic Cooperation sorted by their imports.

Notes

See also
 Organisation of Islamic Cooperation
 Economy of the Organisation of Islamic Cooperation
 List of Organisation of Islamic Cooperation member states by GDP (PPP)
 List of Organisation of Islamic Cooperation member states by GDP per capita (PPP)
 List of Organisation of Islamic Cooperation member states by exports

Imports, Organisation of Islamic Cooperation
International trade-related lists
Import
Organisation of Islamic Cooperation-related lists